Club Deportivo Mengíbar is a football team based in Mengíbar.
Refounded in 2008, the team plays in Primera Categoría Provincial de Andalucía (Jaén Group 1).

The club's home ground is Estadio Ramón Díaz López.

History
Mengíbar CF was founded in 1993. In 2008-09 season not played in Tercera División and was founded the CD Mengíbar.

Background
Mengíbar CF - (1993-2008)
CD Mengíbar - (2008-... )

Uniform

External links
 Official Website

Football clubs in Andalusia
Association football clubs established in 2008
2008 establishments in Spain